Saarijärvi (literally "island lake") is a common name of lakes in Finland. It may mean:

Saarijärvi, a municipality in Central Finland region
Saarijärvi crater, a lake formed in an impact crater in Taivalkoski, Northern Ostrobothnia